This list of tallest buildings in the Washington metropolitan area ranks high-rises, skyscrapers, and other buildings in the Washington metropolitan area, the metropolitan area centered on Washington, D.C., by height. The metropolitan area includes all of Washington, D.C. and parts of the states of Maryland, Virginia, and West Virginia. Due to height restrictions imposed in Washington D.C., a majority of the tallest buildings in the D.C metropolitan area are located outside of Washington D.C.

The tallest structure in the area, excluding radio towers and other freestanding towers not included, is the Washington Monument, which rises 555 feet (169 m) and was completed in 1884. The structure, however, is not generally considered a high-rise building as it does not have successive floors that can be occupied; it is only included in this list for comparative purposes.

Tallest buildings

Notes 
A. Not a habitable building, but is included in this list for comparative purposes.

B. All counties within the District of Columbia were abolished by the District of Columbia Organic Act of 1871.

C. Alexandria and Falls Church are independent cities and are not in the territory of any county.

References 

 
Tallest
Washington
Tallest buildings